Wanås Castle is an estate in Östra Göinge Municipality, Scania, in southern Sweden.

Wanås exhibitions
Since 1987, contemporary art with a focus on site-specific installations has been displayed at Wanås. Art is displayed in the park and in exhibition halls in renovated stables and warehouse buildings from the 18th and 19th centuries. In the park there are some 70 sculptures and installations permanently on display.

Selection of the outdoors exhibitions 

The little bridge (1988), diabas, by Stefan Wewerka
Black line (1988), Raffael Rheinsberg
Terra Maximus (1989), by Sissel Tolaas
Gray Clam (1990), by Jene Highstein
Pyramiden (1990), by Gunilla Bandolin
Stigma (1991), by Gloria Friedmann
Observatorium (1992), by Icelandic sculptor Rúrí (f 1951)
Cow Chapel (1993), by Kari Cavén
Wanås (1994), by Per Kirkeby
Sprungen Ur (1996), by Pål Svensson
Parables (1998), by Allan McCollum
The Hunt Chair for Animal Spirits (1998), by Marina Abramović
Imposter (1999), by Roxy Paine
A House for Edwin Denby (2000), by Robert Wilson
Fideicommissum (2000), bronze, by Ann-Sofi Sidén
Two Different Anamorphic Surfaces (2000), by Dan Graham
Together and Apart (2001), by Antony Gormley
Wanås Wall (2002), by Jenny Holzer
Vertigo (2002), by Charlotte Gyllenhammar
lignum (2002), by Ann Hamilton
I Am Thinking About Myself – Wanås 2003 (2003), Marianne Lindberg De Geer
11 Minute Line (2004), by Maya Lin
The eighth chimney (2007), tegel, by Jan Svenungsson

A selection of the permanent indoors exhibition 
Svindel (2002), by Charlotte Gyllenhammar
lignum (2002), by Ann Hamilton
Graf Spee (2007), by Jan Håfström together with Carl Michael von Hausswolff and Juan Pedro Fabra

See also 
List of castles in Sweden

References

Other sources
Osterby, Anette (2000) Dan Graham : two different anamorphic surfaces : a new two way mirror pavilion in the Wanås Park, Sweden (The Wannas Foundation) 
Johnsson, Pehr  (1930) Vanås : göingebygdens största herresätepp (Malmö : Scania)

External links 
Wanås webpage

Castles in Skåne County
Art museums and galleries in Sweden
Museums in Skåne County